{{Speciesbox
| image = Aeolesthes oenochrous (16148954887).jpg
| genus = Hemadius
| parent_authority = Fairmaire, 1889
| species = oenochrous
| authority = Fairmaire, 1889
| display_parents = 3
| synonyms = 
 Neocerambyx oenochrousHemadius oenochrous Fairmaire, 1889
Aeolesthes oenochrous (Fairmaire, 1889) 
Hemadius oenochroa (Fairmaire, 1889) (misspelling)
}}Hemadius  is a monotypic genus of longhorn beetles, containing the species Hemadius oenochrous in the tribe Cerambycini and previously placed in the genus Neocerambyx. It is native to Asia, where it occurs in China, Vietnam, Laos, and Taiwan. It is known commonly as the cherry tree longhorned beetle and Wushe blood-spotted longhorned beetle.

This beetle is about 4.5 to 6.5 centimeters long with a narrow body. It is black with a red sheen. The male has antennae longer than its body length; the female has shorter antennae.

This beetle lives in forests, where it specializes on cherry and peach trees (Prunus'' spp.).

References

External links
Beetle (Aeolesthes oenochrous). Taiwan Postage Stamps, Long-horned Beetle Series.

Hemadius oenochrous. Catalogue of Life 29 January 2016.

Cerambycini
Beetles of Asia
Insects of China
Insects of Laos
Insects of Taiwan
Insects of Vietnam
Beetles described in 1889
Taxa named by Léon Fairmaire
Cerambycidae genera